Statistics of Primera Fuerza in season 1906-07.

Overview
It was contested by 5 teams, and Reforma won the championship.

League standings

Top goalscorers
Players sorted first by goals scored, then by last name.

References

Mexico - List of final tables (RSSSF)

1906-07
Mex
1906–07 in Mexican football